The West Asian Games (also known as the WAG) is a multi-sport event held among the athletes from West Asia.

The West Asian Games was first organised in Tehran, Iran and was considered as the first of its kind. The success of the Games led to the creation of the West Asian Games Federation (WAGF) and the intention of hosting the Games every four years. At present, the WAGF comprises 12 member countries, namely Bahrain, Iraq, Jordan, Kuwait, Lebanon, Oman, Palestine, Qatar, Saudi Arabia, Syria, the United Arab Emirates and Yemen.

The West Asian Games is one of the five subregional Games of the Olympic Council of Asia (OCA). The others are the Central Asian Games, the East Asian Youth Games, the South Asian Games, and the Southeast Asian Games (or SEA Games).

The fourth edition of the West Asian Games was scheduled to take place in Iran in 2014, but was then postponed to 2016. It was eventually cancelled after Iran moved its athletics region from West Asia to Central Asia in September 2015.

List of West Asian Games

All-time West Asian Games medal table

Sports

Basketball

Football

Handball

Volleyball

See also 

 Events of the OCA (Continental)
 Asian Games
 Asian Winter Games
 Asian Youth Games
 Asian Beach Games
 Asian Indoor and Martial Arts Games

 Events of the OCA (Subregional)
 Central Asian Games
 East Asian Games (now defunct)
 East Asian Youth Games
 South Asian Games
 Southeast Asian Games

 Events of the APC (Continental)
 Asian Para Games
 Asian Winter Para Games
 Asian Youth Para Games
 Asian Youth Winter Para Games

 Events of the APC (Subregional)
 ASEAN Para Games

References

External links 
 West Asian Games Federation official website
 2nd West Asian Games medalists
 3rd West Asian Games Doha 2005

 
Multi-sport events in Asia